Sergei Alexeyevich Bessonov (6 August 1892  – 11 September 1941) was a Soviet state, public and party activist and diplomat. He was one of the defendants in the Case of the Anti-Soviet "Bloc of Rightists and Trotskyites" of 2–13 March 1938. He was one of only three defendants who did not receive the death penalty. Sentenced to 15 years in prison, he was extrajudicially executed by the NKVD during Operation Barbarossa of the Eastern Front of World War II alongside Olga Kameneva, Christian Rakovsky, and Maria Spiridonova in Oryol Oblast.

See also
Medvedev Forest massacre

References

1892 births
1941 deaths
Institute of Red Professors alumni
Great Purge victims from Russia
People executed by the Soviet Union